Mackerras is a Scottish surname consisting of Mac "son of" and Kerras (=Fergus), i.e. Ferguson.

Notable people with the surname include:

 Charles Mackerras AC, CH, CBE (1925–2010), Australian conductor
 Colin Mackerras AO (born 1939), Australian sinologist
 Ian Murray Mackerras (1898–1980), Australian zoologist
 Mabel Josephine Mackerras (1896–1971), Australian zoologist
 Malcolm Mackerras AO (born 1939), Australian psephologist, commentator and lecturer on Australian and American politics
 Neil Mackerras (1930–1987), Australian barrister and social campaigner

See also
 36226 Mackerras (1999 UQ4), main-belt asteroid
 Ferguson

References